Oxford Schools (Arabic: مدارس اكسفورد) is an International English and National Arabic medium co-education private school. The school is situated in Amman, Jordan. It offers both British and American curriculum programs for its students.

External links 

Official website

Schools in Amman
Elementary and primary schools in Jordan
International schools in Jordan
Private schools in Jordan
Educational institutions established in 1996
1996 establishments in Jordan
Jordan
High schools and secondary schools in Jordan
Jordan